The Suci (Greek: Σοῦκοι or Σύκοι S(o)ukoi) were a Dacian tribe located in what is now Oltenia.  Their main fortress was Sucidava, in what is now Corabia, on the north bank of the Danube.

References

Ancient tribes in Dacia
Dacian tribes